Bae Hyun-jin (Hangul: 배현진; born 6 November 1983) is a South Korean broadcaster and politician. Prior to entering politics, she was the anchor for Munhwa Broadcasting Corporation (MBC), based in Seoul, South Korea.

Career
Bae graduated from Sookmyung Women's University's Seoul campus with a degree in Communications and Korean Language and Literature after graduating from Dongsan High School in Ansan, Gyeonggi-do, Korea. She won the silver prize at the Sookmyung Speech Contest and Speaker prize at the University Student Speech Contest in 2007 when she was a university student.  She also did the student model of Sookmyung Women's University during her school life. She was picked up by MBC in November 2008 among 1,926 competitors and began presenting news updates for the 5 p.m. MBC News in 2009.

Bae's career at MBC began in November 2009, presenting late news updates in MBC News programs and delivering error corrections in Korean in the MBC TV program "우리말 나들이" (roughly: "A Visit to Our Language"). She has presented one-off events such as the Guangzhou Asian Games as a newscaster in 2010. She also was an MC for the MBC TV debate program, 100 Minute Debate (100분토론), and MBC radio program, Bae Hyun-jin's World City Travels (배현진의 세계도시여행), which features world-famous cities, in 2010. She sometimes appears in entertainment TV programs such as Three Wheels (세바퀴) and Infinite Challenge (무한도전). She has been a main anchor with Kwon Jae-hong for MBC News Desk in the place of announcer Lee Jung-min since 8 April 2011. Although she has had a short career as an anchor, she responded calmly when Kwon Jae-hong abruptly left in the middle of a program because of a sudden headache 27 July 2011.

Personal life
Recently she appeared in the TV show Infinite Challenge (무한도전) as a special guest to teach Korean, and she said she has never had a boyfriend. In the Western zodiac she is a Scorpio, and she is a Pig according to the Chinese zodiac, which is related with her birth saju. She enjoys yoga, reading and baseball as her hobbies.

Electoral history

References 

 MBC announcer introduction page

1983 births
Living people
South Korean announcers